Eucosma albidulana is a moth belonging to the family Tortricidae. The species was first described by Gottlieb August Wilhelm Herrich-Schäffer in 1851.

It is native to Europe.

References

Eucosmini
Moths described in 1851